The 2020–21 season was Motherwell's thirty-sixth consecutive season in the top flight of Scottish football, having been promoted from the Scottish First Division at the end of the 1984–85 season.

Season review

Pre-season
On 17 June, UEFA announced that all UEFA Europa League qualifying and playoffs rounds would be played over one-leg, instead of the usual two, with Motherwell's First Round match taking place on 27 August.

On 23 June, Declan Gallagher was announced as the club's new captain, with Trevor Carson being appointed vice-captain after former captain Peter Hartley left the club at the end of the previous season.

On 24 June, Motherwell announced that they had giving permission to manager Stephen Robinson to discuss the vacant Northern Ireland managerial position.

On 27 June, Charles Dunne signed a new short-term contract with the club, until December 2020.

On 10 July, Chris Long signed a new one-year contract with the club.

Transfers
On 10 June, Motherwell announced the singing of Ricki Lamie on a contract until the summer of 2022.

On 12 June, Motherwell announced their second singing of the summer, with Jordan White.

On 15 June, Motherwell announced the signing of Nathan McGinley to a two-year contract after his contract with Forest Green Rovers had expired. The following day, Motherwell announced that youngsters Barry Maguire, Harry Robinson and Yusuf Hussain had all signed new one-year contracts with the club.

On 22 June, Motherwell announced the singing of Scott Fox on a one-year contract, after his Partick Thistle contract had expired.

On 24 June, Motherwell announced that they had signed Mark O'Hara on permanent deal from Peterborough United for a nominal fee, with O'Hara signing a two-year contract.

On 3 July, Motherwell announced the return of Jake Hastie on a season-long loan deal from Rangers.

On 29 July, Motherwell announced the signing of Callum Lang on a season-long loan deal from Wigan Athletic.

On 13 August, Motherwell announced the signing of Stephen O'Donnell on a contract until the mid-season transfer window.

On 27 August, David Turnbull left the club to sign for Celtic for a club-record fee, reported to be in the £3,000,000 range.

On 15 September, Jamie Semple joined Scottish League One club Cove Rangers on a season-long loan.

On 18 September, Motherwell signed Robbie Crawford on loan from Livingston until January 2021, whilst Harry Robinson was loaned out to Queen of the South for the remainder of the season.

On 21 September, Ross MacIver joined Greenock Morton on loan for the season.

October
On 2 October, the day of the game, Motherwell's trip to Kilmarnock was postponed due to an outbreak of COVID-19 within the Kilmarnock squad. Later on the same day, Motherwell announced the departure of Jermaine Hylton to Ross County and the arrival of Devante Cole on a permanent deal until the end of the season.

The same day, the 2020-21 Challenge Cup was cancelled due to the restrictions surrounding the Covid-19 pandemic in Scotland.

On 4 October, Sam Muir moved to Gretna 2008 on loan for the season. On 7 October, Motherwell announced the signing of Aaron Chapman on a contract until the end of the season, and Matthew Connelly joined Falkirk on a short-term loan deal. On 15 October, PJ Morrison joined Falkirk on loan for the remainder of the season.
On 17 October, Motherwell's trip to St Mirren was cancelled after St Mirren informed the SPFL that they could not field a squad.

After Trevor Carson suffered a knee injury that will see him ruled out for 'several months', Motherwell signed Jordan Archer on 28 October to a short-term deal until January 2021.

November
On 9 November, Tony Watt extended his contract with Motherwell until the summer of 2022.

December
On 3 December, the SPFL awarded Motherwell a 3-0 technical victory over Kilmarnock in relation to their postponed game scheduled for 2 October, and a 3-0 technical victory over St Mirren in relation to their postponed game scheduled for 17 October. On 26 December, the two technical victories over Kilmarnock and St Mirren where suspended after appeals from both clubs.

On 31 December, Stephen Robinson resigned as Motherwell manager following an 8-game winless streak, with Keith Lasley being appointed Interim Manager.

January
On 2 January, PJ Morrison was recalled from his loan at Falkirk.

On 5 January, Motherwell confirmed that Jordan Archer had left the club after his contract had expired, to sign for Middlesbrough. The following day, Callum Lang was recalled from his loan by parent club Wigan Athletic, and goalkeeper Liam Kelly signed on loan from Queens Park Rangers until the end of the season.

On 7 January, Graham Alexander was appointed as Motherwell's new manager. The following day, Ross MacIver was recalled from his loan spell with Greenock Morton.

On 15 January, Motherwell announced the return of Academy graduate, Steven Lawless on a permanent transfer from Burton Albion, until the end of the 2021-22 season.

On 18 January, Motherwells postponed match against Kilmarnock from 2 October was rescheduled for 10 February, and their game against St Mirren originally scheduled for 17 October was rescheduled for 24 February.

On 21 January, Motherwell announced that Jake Carroll had signed a new contract with the club until the summer of 2023, and the signing of Harry Smith on loan from Northampton Town for the remainder of the season.

On 28 January, Jordan White left Motherwell to sign for Ross County. The following day, Motherwell signed Sam Foley from St Mirren on a contract until the end of the season.

February
On 1 February, Motherwell announced the permanent signing of Robbie Crawford from Livingston on a contract until the end of the season, and the extension of Charles Dunne and Stephen O'Donnells contracts extended until the end of the season. Later that same evening, Motherwell announced that Jamie Semple had been recalled from his loan deal with Cove Rangers, due to the suspension of football below the Championship, and the loan signings of Jordan Roberts from Heart of Midlothian and Eddie Nolan from Crewe Alexandra, both until the end of the season.
On 2 February, Queen of the South confirmed that Harry Robinson had returned to Motherwell after his loan spell was ended, and Tyler Magloire joined Motherwell from Blackburn Rovers on loan for the remainder of the season.

March
On 11 March, Yusuf Hussain joined Brechin City on loan for the remainder of the season, with Ross MacIver joining Partick Thistle on a similar deal the following day.

April
On 9 April, PJ Morrison joined Ayr United on an initial seven-day emergency loan deal.

On 13 April, Stephen O'Donnell signed a new two-year contract with Motherwell, keeping him at the club until the summer of 2023.

On 30 April, Graham Alexander was announced as the Scottish Premiership manager of the month for April.

May
On 17 May, Scott Fox joined Greenock Morton on an emergency loan deal for their Scottish Championship play-off finals against Airdrieonians.

On 24 May, Motherwell announced that Allan Campbell, Aaron Chapman, Findlay Cook, Sam Foley, Declan Gallagher, Paul Hale, Yusuf Hussain, Chris Long, Ross MacIver, Matthew McDonald, Sam Muir, Liam Polworth, Lewis Robertson, Harry Robinson, Sherwin Seedorf, Jamie Semple and Cammy Williamson would all be leaving the club at the end of the season when their contracts expire, whilst Devante Cole, Dean Cornelius, Charles Dunne and Scott Fox had all either been offered new contracts or had been invited back for pre-season training.

Transfers

In

Loans in

Out

Loans out

Released

Squad

Left club during season

Friendlies

Competitions

Premiership

League table

Results by round

Results summary

Results

Scottish Cup

League Cup

UEFA Europa League

Qualifying rounds

Squad statistics

Appearances

|-
|colspan="14"|Players away from the club on loan:

|-
|colspan="14"|Players who left Motherwell during the season:

|}

Goal scorers

Clean sheets

Disciplinary record

Awards

Manager of the Month

See also
 List of Motherwell F.C. seasons

References

Motherwell F.C. seasons
Motherwell
Motherwell